Swallowfield is a village and civil parish in Berkshire, England.

Swallowfield may also refer to:

 Swallowfield Park, a stately home located near the village of Swallowfield, England
 Swallowfield, Kentucky, a community in Franklin County, Kentucky, US